Baaiduinen is a village on the Frisian Wadden Sea island of Terschelling in the Netherlands. It had a population of 106 in January 2017.

Baaiduinen is surrounded by the much older hamlets of Kinnum, Kaart (Kaard) en Horp. Baaiduinen is the youngest village on Terschelling and has only been recognized as a separate settlement in the 19th century. North of Baaiduinen is a polder landscape named het Hoge Land ("the highlands").

Tourism has replaced dairy farming as the main source of income and most farms have been rebuilt to accommodate tourists.

References

Populated places in Friesland
Terschelling